Sydney Motorsport Park (known until May 2012 as Eastern Creek International Raceway) is a motorsport circuit located on Brabham Drive, Eastern Creek (40-kilometres west of the Sydney CBD), New South Wales, Australia, adjacent to the Western Sydney International Dragway. It was built and is owned by the New South Wales Government and is operated by the Australian Racing Drivers Club. The circuit is one of only two permanent tracks in Australia with an FIA Grade 2 license and is licensed for both cars and motorcycles.

History
The development of circuit was approved in 1989 and construction began soon after. However, construction was delayed by poor weather and debates over land ownership. A test race open to Superbikes was held in July 1990 and the circuit was officially opened by then-New South Wales Minister for Sport Bob Rowland-Smith on 10 November 1990 with the running of the Nissan Sydney 500 endurance race for Group A touring cars. In 1991, the consortium formed to fund the circuit suffered financial problems and the complex was purchased by the New South Wales Government. The pit facilities provide fifty garages with direct access to the paddock area and a covered 4,000-seat grandstand overlooks the finish line, providing a view of the majority of the circuit. Events are held at the circuit on most weekends during the year.

Redevelopment
On 11 August 2006, the Sydney Morning Herald reported that Ron Dickson, the A1 Grand Prix circuit designer who also designed the Surfers Paradise Street Circuit, suggested that Sydney Motorsport Park was not up to modern standards and needed to be upgraded. On 28 April 2008, it was announced that Apex Circuit Design Ltd. had been commissioned to perform a $350,000 feasibility study on upgrading the track to suit more purposes and hold larger events such as the Australian Formula One Grand Prix, however nothing came of this proposed upgrade.

In early 2011, the circuit received funding for a $9 million upgrade, with the New South Wales Government providing $7 million and the Australian Racing Drivers Club funding the other $2 million. The upgrade also included an additional pit lane facility to cater for the new configuration, a new race control tower and new amenities buildings. Work on the upgrades began in June 2011, with a new piece of road joining turns four and nine. This link road, finished in October 2011, created the new "Druitt Circuit", also known as the North Circuit. The 830-metre extension on the south-eastern part of the circuit was completed in May 2012 to create the new "Amaroo Circuit" (or South Circuit). On 21 May 2012, the circuit was renamed from Eastern Creek International Raceway to Sydney Motorsport Park. Construction of the new pit lane between turns four and five also began at this time.

Configurations

Major events

Motorcycling
After the first Australian motorcycle Grand Prix held at Phillip Island in 1989, there was a conflict over advertising between the Victorian Government and the tobacco industry, who were major sponsors of the Grand Prix teams. The New South Wales Government saw this as an opportunity to bring the race to Sydney and in October 1990, a deal was made for the Grand Prix to be held at what was then known as Eastern Creek International Raceway from 1991 to 1993. The race remained at the circuit until 1996 before returning to Phillip Island in 1997.

The circuit has also hosted rounds of the Australian Superbike Championship.

Australian motorcycle Grand Prix winners

A1 Grand Prix
The Australian round of the A1 Grand Prix championship was held at Sydney Motorsport Park from the 2005–06 season to the 2007–08 season. During the 2006–07 event on 4 February 2007, German driver Nico Hülkenberg set the outright lap record for the original circuit layout with a 1:19.142 lap time in the A1 Team Germany prepared Lola-Zytek.

A1 Grand Prix winners

Touring cars

The first touring car event at the circuit was the 1990 Nissan Sydney 500, an endurance race which was the final round of both the 1990 Australian Endurance Championship and the 1990 Australian Manufacturers' Championship. In the early 1990s, the circuit also hosted the Winfield Triple Challenge, an event which featured Australian Touring Car Championship (ATCC) teams and drivers alongside Superbikes and drag racing.

The circuit first hosted a championship round of the ATCC (now known as V8 Supercars) in 1992 and held a round every year, excluding 1998 and 2006, until 2008. Further to this, the circuit hosted the season-ending Grand Finale in 2003 and 2004, with Marcos Ambrose winning the round and the championship title on both occasions. In 2009 the circuit was dropped in favour of the Sydney 500 on the Sydney Olympic Park Street Circuit. The circuit returned to the V8 Supercars calendar in 2012 after V8 Supercars failed to secure a second international event. After another year off the calendar in 2013, the circuit has returned to the calendar from 2014 onwards.

The official pre-season V8 Supercar test day was held at the circuit in 2011 and 2013 to 2015. The 2013 test day was the first time that the four Car of the Future manufacturers appeared together at a public event. The 2015 test day clashed with the 2015 Liqui Moly Bathurst 12 Hour, preventing V8 Supercars drivers from competing in the race.

ATCC / V8 Supercar round winners

Notes
  –  Sydney Motorsport Park hosted two rounds of the 2003, 2004 and 2020 V8 Supercar Championship Series.
  –  Sydney Motorsport Park hosted four rounds of the 2021 V8 Supercars Championship Series.

Winfield Triple Challenge
Between 1992 and 1995, the circuit hosted a non-championship Triple Challenge event in late January consisting of touring cars, Superbikes and drag racing. The event was backed by the Winfield cigarette brand, to promote their sponsorship of all three categories of racing. Glenn Seton Racing, sponsored by rival cigarette brand Peter Jackson, won the touring car element of the event in all four years, with eponymous team owner/driver Glenn Seton winning three. In practice for the 1995 event, the Winfield-backed entry of Mark Skaife had a major accident at Turn 1, hitting concrete drag racing barriers which resulted in injuries that forced him to miss the first round of the 1995 Australian Touring Car Championship. The event concluded with the ban of cigarette advertising in Australia at the end of 1995.

Touring car winners

Muscle Car Masters

An event organised and promoted by Australian Muscle Car magazine, the Muscle Car Masters is held on Father's Day every year. The event includes races and demonstration laps featuring Australian muscle cars and ex-race cars from the 1950s to the 1990s. Regular racing classes include Group N, Group C, Group A and Touring Car Masters while different car clubs have their cars on display each year and take part in demonstration laps. Historically significant cars in Australian motorsport are also present and complete laps of the circuit. While the main focus is on the history of Australian touring car racing, other classes, such as Formula 5000, have also appeared.

Music venue

In the 1990s, the venue held a number of rock concerts and music festivals including Guns N' Roses, Bon Jovi, Pearl Jam, the Alternative Nation festival and the Colossus 2 dance festival. Music festivals returned to the circuit in 2009 and 2010 when it hosted the Soundwave Festival for both years.

Lap records

Daniel Ricciardo drove a Red Bull RB7 Formula One car during the Top Gear Festival at the circuit in March 2014 and set the unofficial lap time record with a time of 1:11.2330. However, as this time was not recorded during a race, it does not count as a lap record. As of August 2022, the official race lap records at Sydney Motorsport Park are listed as:

Notes

References

External links
 
 Map and circuit history at RacingCircuits.info

A1 Grand Prix circuits
Grand Prix motorcycle circuits
Motorsport venues in New South Wales
Drag racing venues in Australasia
Music venues in Sydney
Former Supercars Championship circuits
Sports venues in Sydney
Motorsport in Sydney
1990 establishments in Australia
Sports venues completed in 1990